Gonioterma dimetropis is a moth in the family Depressariidae. It was described by Edward Meyrick in 1932. It is found in Mexico (Guerrero).

References

Moths described in 1932
Gonioterma